Michael "Mike" Thompson (b. on June 16, 1977 in Akwesasne, Ontario) is a retired professional box lacrosse player. Thompson played seven seasons in the National Lacrosse League, six with the Buffalo Bandits.

He signed with the Bandits on August 18, 2006 to replace Ken Montour as back-up goalie to Steve Dietrich. Thompson took over the starting duties from Dietrich due to injuries during the 2007 season and played well enough to inevitably make Dietrich expendable after the season.

In 2008, Montour came back to Buffalo, he and Thompson formed a goalie platoon for the Bandits leading to the franchise's fourth NLL Championship. Thompson would make 39 saves, including one as time expired, as he went the whole way in the 2008 Champion's Cup.

Thompson retired from the NLL following the 2012 NLL season, although he was an unused backup for two games in 2014 for the Rochester Knighthawks.

Statistics

NLL

References

1976 births
Living people
Buffalo Bandits players
Canadian lacrosse players
Iroquois nations lacrosse players
Sportspeople from Ontario
First Nations sportspeople